Lithium oxide (O) or lithia is an inorganic chemical compound. It is a white solid. Although not specifically important, many materials are assessed on the basis of their Li2O content. For example, the Li2O content of the principal lithium mineral spodumene (LiAlSi2O6) is 8.03%.

Production

Lithium oxide is produced by thermal decomposition of lithium peroxide at 300–400 °C.

Lithium oxide forms along with small amounts of lithium peroxide when lithium metal is burned in the air at and combines with oxygen at temperatures above 100 °C:
4Li +  → 2.
Pure  can be produced by the thermal decomposition of lithium peroxide, at 450 °C
2 → 2 +

Structure
Solid lithium oxide adopts an antifluorite structure with four-coordinated Li+ centers and eight-coordinated oxides.

The ground state gas phase  molecule is linear with a bond length consistent with strong ionic bonding.

Uses
Lithium oxide is used as a flux in ceramic glazes; and creates blues with copper and pinks with cobalt. Lithium oxide reacts with water and steam, forming lithium hydroxide and should be isolated from them.

Its usage is also being investigated for non-destructive emission spectroscopy evaluation and degradation monitoring within thermal barrier coating systems. It can be added as a co-dopant with yttria in the zirconia ceramic top coat, without a large decrease in expected service life of the coating. At high heat, lithium oxide emits a very detectable spectral pattern, which increases in intensity along with degradation of the coating. Implementation would allow in situ monitoring of such systems, enabling an efficient means to predict lifetime until failure or necessary maintenance.

Lithium metal might be obtained from lithium oxide by electrolysis, releasing oxygen as by-product.

Reactions
Lithium oxide absorbs carbon dioxide forming lithium carbonate:
 +  → 

The oxide reacts slowly with water, forming lithium hydroxide:
 +  → 2

See also
 Lithium monoxide anion
 Lithium peroxide
 Lithium cobalt oxide
 Lithium-oxide memristor

References

External links
 CeramicMaterials.Info entry

Oxides
Lithium compounds
Fluorite crystal structure